Defending champion Monica Seles defeated Arantxa Sánchez Vicario in the final, 6–3, 6–4 to win the women's singles title at the 1991 French Open.

The tournament marked the most decisive defeat suffered by Steffi Graf at a major: she won just two games in her semifinal against Sánchez Vicario.

Seeds
The seeded players are listed below. Monica Seles is the champion; others show the round in which they were eliminated.

  Monica Seles (champion)
  Steffi Graf (semifinals)
  Gabriela Sabatini (semifinals)
  Mary Joe Fernández (quarterfinals)
  Arantxa Sánchez Vicario (finalist)
  Jana Novotná (quarterfinals)
  Conchita Martínez (quarterfinals)
  Zina Garrison (first round)
  Manuela Maleeva (second round)
  Jennifer Capriati (fourth round)
  Katerina Maleeva (third round)
  Helena Suková (second round)
  Nathalie Tauziat (quarterfinals)
  Leila Meskhi (fourth round)
  Natasha Zvereva (second round)
  Anke Huber (third round)

Qualifying

Draw

Key
 Q = Qualifier
 WC = Wild card
 LL = Lucky loser
 r = Retired

Finals

Earlier rounds

Section 1

Section 2

Section 3

Section 4

Section 5

Section 6

Section 7

Section 8

External links
1991 French Open – Women's draws and results at the International Tennis Federation

Women's Singles
French Open by year – Women's singles
French Open - Women's Singles
1991 in women's tennis
1991 in French women's sport